Totuqlu (also, Totuxlu) is a village in the municipality of Qoşabulaq in the Gadabay Rayon of Azerbaijan.

References

Populated places in Gadabay District